Dusk is the time of day just after sunset.

Dusk may also refer to:

Film and television
 Dusk, a 1970 film featuring Peter Yang
 Dusk, a 2010 film featuring Melody Klaver
 Dusk, a fictional film series in the 2010 film My Babysitter's a Vampire
 Dusk!, a European erotic television channel for women
 Dusk (TV channel), a defunct Canadian cable channel

Literature
 Darkwing (novel) or Dusk, a 2007 Silverwing novel by Kenneth Oppel
 Po-on or Dusk, a 1984 novel by F. Sionil Jose
 Dusk, a 2006 novel by Tim Lebbon
 Dusk (comics), several Marvel Comics characters
 Dusk (play), a 1941 verse drama by Paul Goodman
 Nathaniel Dusk, a DC Comics character
 Dusk, a character in DC Comics' The Final Night

Music

Classical and jazz compositions
 Dusk, two compositions (2004, 2008) by Steven Bryant
 Dusk, a 1944 choral work by Ferenc Farkas
 "Dusk", a 1926 song by Roy Agnew
 "Dusk", a waltz by Cecil Armstrong Gibbs
 "Dusk", a c. 1940 composition by Duke Ellington; see the 1986 album The Blanton–Webster Band

Bands
 Dusk, a 1970s American girl group featuring Peggy Santiglia

Albums
 Dusk (Andrew Hill album) or the title song, 2000
 Dusk (Badlands album), 1998
 Dusk (The The album), 1993
 Dusk (EP), by Mxmtoon, 2020
 Dusk, by Ladyfinger (ne), 2009

Songs
 “Dusk”, by Entombed from Entombed, 1997
 “Dusk”, by Genesis from Trespass, 1970

Other uses
 Dusk (Michelangelo), a c. 1524–1534 marble sculpture in the Medici Chapel, Florence, Italy
 Dusk (video game), a 2018 first-person shooter 
 Dusk, West Virginia, US
 Matt Dusk (born 1978), Canadian jazz vocalist
 Dusk, a nightclub at Caesars Atlantic City